Ankh Ka Tara is a 1978 Bollywood film directed by Shantilal Soni.

Plot

Cast
Sachin as Makhan / Mohan
Bindiya Goswami as Geeta Gupta
Ajit as Ramlal
Bharat Bhushan
Bindu as Shalu
Dulari as Rukmani
Preeti Ganguli as Govind's daughter
Mukri as Govind
Paintal as Amar
Nirupa Roy as Parvati
Om Shivpuri as Ashok Gupta (as Om Shiv Puri)
Tun Tun

External links
 

1978 films
1970s Hindi-language films